The list of castles is a link page for any castle in the sense of a fortified building.

Afghanistan

Albania

Argentina
 Castillo Naveira

Armenia

Austria

Azerbaijan

Belarus

Belgium

Bosnia and Herzegovina

Brazil

Bulgaria

Canada

China

Colombia
 Castillo San Felipe de Barajas

Croatia

Cuba
 La Cabaña
 Morro Castle
 Real Fuerza castle
 San Pedro de la Roca Castle

Cyprus

Czech Republic

Denmark

Dominican Republic
 Fortaleza Ozama

Egypt

Estonia

Ethiopia
 Guzara Castle
 Fasilides Castle
 Kusquam Castle

Finland

France

Germany

Ghana

Greece

Guernsey

Hungary

India

Iran

Iraq

Ireland

Isle of Man

Israel

Italy

Japan

Jersey

Jordan

Kenya
 Fort Jesus
 Lord Egerton Castle (Ngata)

Korea

Latvia

Lebanon

Libya

Murzuk Castle in Murzuk
Sabha Castle in Sabha
Red Castle in Tripoli

Liechtenstein

Lithuania

Luxembourg

Malta

Mexico

Moldova

Soroca Castle

Mongolia
Artificial Lake Castle
Mongol Castle
Ordu-Baliq
Sangiin Kerem
Tsagaan Baishin of Choghtu Khong Tayiji

Namibia

Netherlands

New Zealand
Cargill's Castle
Larnach Castle

North Macedonia

Norway

Pakistan

Poland

Portugal

Romania

Russia

Saudi Arabia

Serbia

Slovakia

Slovenia

South Africa

 Castle Kyalami
 Castle of Good Hope
 Castle On the Cliff
 Erasmus Castle
 Knoetzie Castles

Spain

Sri Lanka

Sweden

Switzerland

Syria

Tibet

Potala
Yungbulakang Castle

Turkey

Ukraine

United Kingdom

United States

Venezuela

Yemen